Bone Hill may refer to:

Bone Hill (Missouri), a hill in Jackson County, Missouri
Bone Hill National Wildlife Refuge, a protected area in North Dakota

See also
 Bonehill (surname)